Paraxanthodes obtusidens is a species of crab found in the bays of Japan and the China Sea.

References

Crustaceans described in 1965